Purulia Union is an Union Parishad under Lohagara Upazila of Narail District in the division of Khulna, Bangladesh. It has an area of 70.39 km2 (27.18 sq mi) and a population of 23,593.

References

Unions of Kalia Upazila
Unions of Narail District
Unions of Khulna Division